Udea olivalis is a species of moth of the family Crambidae. It was first described by Michael Denis and Ignaz Schiffermüller in 1775 and is found in Europe.

The wingspan is 24–28 mm. The forewings are greyish ochreous
or brownish, densely sprinkled with dark fuscous lines hardly darker, indistinct, second serrate, often posteriorly whitish -edged, preceded in middle by a white spot, curved, with abrupt deep sinuation inwards below middle; large orbicular and reniform discal spot darker, separated by a subquadrate white spot; posterior half of costa whitish, dotted with dark fuscous. Hindwings white, dorsal half light grey; two dark grey discal dots; a fuscous terminal fascia. The larva is light green; dorsal line dark green; spots large, black; head and plate of 2 black-freckled

The moth flies from May to August depending on the location.

The larvae feed on various herbaceous plants, such as Hedera helix, Lychnis, Urtica, Symphytum officinale and Lamiaceae.

References

External links
 Waarneming.nl 
 Lepidoptera of Belgium
 Udea olivalis at UKMoths

olivalis
Moths described in 1775
Moths of Europe
Moths of Asia
Taxa named by Michael Denis
Taxa named by Ignaz Schiffermüller